Graham Frederick Brown (born 5 November 1950) is an English former professional footballer who played as a goalkeeper in the Football League for Leicester City and in non-League football for Burton Albion.

References

1950 births
Living people
Footballers from Leicester
English footballers
Association football goalkeepers
Leicester City F.C. players
Burton Albion F.C. players
English Football League players